Jiuziguangchang station is a monorail interchange station in Jinghu District, Wuhu, Anhui, China. It is an interchange between Line 1 and Line 2 of Wuhu Rail Transit.

The station opened with line 1 on 3 November 2021. Line 2 opened on 28 December 2021, turning the station into an interchange.

References 

Railway stations in Anhui
Railway stations in China opened in 2021